Selorm Geraldo (born June 23, 1996, in Ghana) is a Ghanaian footballer who plays for CS Don Bosco in the DR Congolese Linafoot.

Career 
Geraldo began his soccer career at Redbull Ghana.  He joined Liberty Professionals 2013 and scored a match winner against Real Tamale United on March 3, 2013.

Joined Al-Ahli Tripoli on a three-year deal August 7, 2013.

He later moved to BA Stars F.C. in the winter.

Just a season at Golden Kicks, he joined TP Mazembe in August 2019 but was loaned to satellite club CS Don Bosco.

International career
Whilst playing domestic football in Ghana, Selorm represented Ghana U20

References

1996 births
Living people
Ghanaian footballers
Real Tamale United players
Association football forwards
TP Mazembe players
BA Stars F.C. players